Short may refer to:

Places 
 Short (crater), a lunar impact crater on the near side of the Moon
 Short, Mississippi, an unincorporated community
 Short, Oklahoma, a census-designated place

People
 Short (surname)
 List of people known as the Short

Arts, entertainment, and media
 Short film, a cinema format (also called film short or short subject)
 Short story, prose generally readable in one sitting
 The Short-Timers, a 1979 semi-autobiographical novel by Gustav Hasford, about military short-timers in Vietnam

Brands and enterprises
 Short Brothers, a British aerospace company
 Short Brothers of Sunderland, former English shipbuilder

Computing and technology
 Short circuit, an accidental connection between two nodes of an electrical circuit
 Short integer, a computer datatype

Finance
 Short (finance), stock-trading position
 Short snorter, a banknote signed by fellow travelers, common during World War II

Foodstuffs
 Short pastry, one which is rich in butter with a crumbly texture, as in shortbread
 Shortening, any kind of fat which creates a crumbly pastry

Healthcare
 Short stature, below average height
 SHORT syndrome, a medical condition in which affected individuals have multiple birth defects
 Shortness of breath, the feeling that one cannot breathe well enough

Other uses
 Short (cricket), fielding positions closer to the batsman
 Short time, a situation in which a civilian employee works reduced hours, or a military person is approaching the end of their enlistment
 Short vowel, a vowel sound of short perceived duration
Extra-short, a speech sound, such as a reduced vowel, of particularly short duration

See also 
 Long (disambiguation)
 Shorter (disambiguation)
 Shorts (disambiguation)
 Skort, shorts with a fabric panel resembling a skirt